Deaconess Hospital may refer to one of the following:
 Arizona Deaconess Hospital, Phoenix, Arizona
 Deaconess Hospital, South Side, Edinburgh
 Deaconess Midtown Hospital, Evansville, Indiana
 Deaconess Gateway Hospital, Newburgh, Indiana
 Deaconess Gibson Hospital, Princeton, Indiana
 Deaconess Hospital (Boston, Massachusetts)
 Beth Israel Deaconess Hospital- Plymouth, Plymouth, Massachusetts
 Deaconess Hospital (St. Louis, Missouri)
 Bozeman Deaconess Hospital, Bozeman, Montana
 Rosebud County Deaconess Hospital, Forsyth, Montana
 Bethany Deaconess Hospital, Queens, New York
 Deaconess Hospital (Cincinnati, Ohio)
 Deaconess Hospital (Oklahoma City, Oklahoma)
 MultiCare Deaconess Hospital, Spokane, Washington

See also
 Beth Israel Deaconess Medical Center

Trauma centers